Gohar Faiz (born 27 September 1986) is a Pakistani cricketer who played for Quetta cricket team and Galle Cricket Club. In January 2021, he was named in Balochistan's squad for the 2020–21 Pakistan Cup.

References

External links
 

1986 births
Living people
Pakistani cricketers
Balochistan cricketers
Galle Cricket Club cricketers
Quetta cricketers
Cricketers from Quetta